Siegfried Böhmke is a German puppeteer, who has been director of the Münchner Marionettentheater since 2000.

References

External links 
 Interview in the Süddeutschen Zeitung (in German)

German puppeteers
Living people
Year of birth missing (living people)